The alveolar lateral ejective affricate is a type of consonantal sound, used in some spoken languages.

Features
Features of the alveolar lateral ejective affricate:

Occurrence

Proto-Semitic *ṣ́ is believed to have been an alveolar lateral ejective affricate.

See also
 List of phonetic topics

References

External links
 

Affricates
Alveolar consonants
Lateral consonants
Ejectives
Oral consonants